Ercüment Sunter (born 6 January 1955) is a Turkish former national basketballer and a coach.

Sunter had managed many teams in Turkish Basketball League as an experienced coach for over 20 years. Beslen, Türk Telekom B.K. (former Turkish PTT basketball team), Ülkerspor are among the teams he coached.

Sunter also coached Turkey national basketball team on both juniors and seniors level and competed in EuroBasket 1997 in Spain.

He joined Türk Telekom B.K. in the beginning of 2007-08 season and got the record as the coach who managed the team for 10 seasons, the longest period.

He is current head coach of Türk Telekom.

External links
Sunter Profile
Profile on Türk Telekom Official Webpage

1955 births
Living people
Basketbol Süper Ligi head coaches
Turkey men's national basketball team coaches
Turkish men's basketball players
Turkish basketball coaches
Türk Telekom basketball coaches